Vladislav Fedosov (born 5 May 1998) is a Belarusian professional footballer who plays for Volna Pinsk.

References

External links 
 
 

1998 births
Living people
People from Mogilev
Sportspeople from Mogilev Region
Belarusian footballers
Association football midfielders
Belarusian expatriate footballers
Expatriate footballers in Kyrgyzstan
FC Dnepr Mogilev players
FC Vitebsk players
FC Volna Pinsk players